Esa Terävä (born 8 November 1987, in Helsinki) is a Finnish footballer, who represents PK-35 in the Veikkausliiga, the premier division of football in Finland. He is also the captain of the team.

He is a former youth player of PK-35 of Vantaa. He made his debut in the first team of PK-35, in the season of 2004. During that season and the two following seasons, he had only a few appearances. In 2008, he represented HIFK in Kakkonen, the third level of Finnish football. In January 2009 he moved to Atlantis FC, who played in Ykkönen for the time being. Terävä had eight appearances in Atlantis before transferring back to PK-35 in July, who played in the same division. Terävä played four seasons for PK-35.

After his spell in PK-35, he moved back to HIFK in January 2013 who played in Kakkonen. On his first season in HIFK were promoted back to Ykkönen. During the season of 2014 in Ykkönen, Terävä was in key role when HIFK won the promotion fight in their last match and got promoted to Veikkausliiga. In late 2014 he made a year long contract with HIFK. He made his debut in Veikkausliiga in April 2015 against IFK Mariehamn. He also scored his first goal in Veikkausliiga in that particular match.

Personal life
In addition to playing football, Terävä studies teaching in University of Helsinki.

References

hifkfotboll.fi

External links

Finnish footballers
Association football midfielders
Veikkausliiga players
HIFK Fotboll players
1987 births
Living people
Footballers from Helsinki